Kati Sebestyén, a native of Hungary, is Professor of Violin and head of the string department at the Royal Conservatory of Brussels. She has played as a part of the Haydn Quartet and leads the Sebestyén String Ensemble.

References

External links
 The Chapel Hill Chamber Music Workshop

Living people
Year of birth missing (living people)
Hungarian violinists
Place of birth missing (living people)
Academic staff of the Royal Conservatory of Brussels
21st-century violinists